Neil Wrede (29 July 1942 – 8 May 2004) was a South African cricketer. He played in thirteen first-class matches for Border from 1964/65 to 1968/69.

See also
 List of Border representative cricketers

References

External links
 

1942 births
2004 deaths
South African cricketers
Border cricketers
Sportspeople from Qonce